= Malaravan =

- Born: 8 April 1972
- Died: 23 November 1992 (aged 20)
- Occupations: Tamil Militant and writer

Malaravan (1972–1992) was a writer in the Tamil language. Four books of his stories and poetry were distributed in north Sri Lanka. He is best known for his memoir Por Ula, which was later translated into English and published as War Journey: Diary of a Tamil Tiger.

== Early life and education ==
Malaravan was born Kasilingam Vijitham, and is a grandson of the writer S. Rajaratnam (Kachchaayil Iraththinam) and a son of the writer Malarannai.

== Writing ==
While in his teens, Malaravan wrote poetry and a novel. He joined the Liberation Tigers of Tamil Eelam in July 1990. During his service, he kept a journal which later became the basis of his book, Por Ula. He died in combat in 1992, and Por ula, an account of Malaravan's experiences in battle as a Tamil Tiger, was published the following year. The book received first prize in an island level competition in 1993. It was reprinted in Tamil five times.

Por Ula was translated to English by N. Malathy and was published as War Journey by Penguin Publishers.

Years after his death, Malaravan's Haiku poems was published in 1998. Also that year his book Short stories and poems (En kallaraiyil thoovungal) was published. His novel Puyal Paravai was published in 2003, and won the North East Sri Lankas Sakithya Mandala prize that year. This book's second edition was published in India in 2015.
